Geraldine Peña is a Colombian karateka. 

In 2021, Peña competed in the World Karate Championships held in Dubai, United Arab Emirates. She won one of the bronze medals in the women's team kumite event.

References 

Date of birth missing (living people)
Living people
Place of birth missing (living people)
Colombian female karateka
21st-century Colombian women